Lechenaultia lutescens is a species of flowering plant in the family Goodeniaceae and is endemic to inland central Australia. It is a wand-shaped, ascending herb or subshrub with rigid, narrow leaves, and orange-yellow to pale yellow or creamy-white flowers.

Description

Taxonomy
Lechenaultia lutescens was first formally described in 1987 by David A. Morrison and Roger Charles Carolin in the journal Brunonia from specimens collected near Yuendumu. The specific epithet (lutescens) means "becoming yellow".

Distribution and habitat
This leschenaultia grows with spinifex on sandplains, dunes and stony creek beds in inland areas of Western Australia and the Northern Territory.

Conservation status
This leschenaultia is listed as "not threatened" by the Government of Western Australia Department of Biodiversity, Conservation and Attractions and of "least concern" under the Northern Territory Territory Parks and Wildlife Conservation Act 1976.

References

Asterales of Australia
lutescens
Eudicots of Western Australia
Flora of the Northern Territory
Plants described in 1987